Passaiyoor also spelled Pasaiyur, is a suburb of the city of Jaffna in northern Sri Lanka. The suburb is divided into two village officer divisions (Passaiyoor East and Passaiyoor West) whose combined population was 2,440 at the 2012 census.

Etymology 
Passaiyoor, also spelt Passaiyur, derives it words from the Tamil words pāci and ūr (village). Pāci can mean fishery, but is also a name of the sea god Varuna. The village has also been recorded as Passur in some historical counts of Jaffna.

History 
The earliest settlers of Jaffna, were according to local legend, a musician and his kinsfolk. According to scholars is the place surrounding Gurunagar, Colombuthurai and Passaiyoor the surmised place where they first settled.

References

Jaffna DS Division
Suburbs of Jaffna